Maçanet may refer to the following places in Catalonia, Spain:

Maçanet de Cabrenys, municipality in the comarca of Vallès Oriental
Maçanet de la Selva, municipality in the comarca of Selva